Igor Zubarev (Russian: Игорь Дмитриевич Зубарев; born 20 July 1966) is a Russian politician serving as a senator from the Legislative Assembly of the Republic of Karelia since 7 October 2021.

Zubarev is under personal sanctions introduced by the European Union, the United Kingdom, the USA, Canada, Switzerland, Australia, Ukraine, New Zealand, for ratifying the decisions of the "Treaty of Friendship, Cooperation and Mutual Assistance between the Russian Federation and the Donetsk People's Republic and between the Russian Federation and the Luhansk People's Republic" and providing political and economic support for Russia's annexation of Ukrainian territories.

Biography

Zubarev was born on 20 July 1966 in Yantarny, Kaliningrad Oblast. In 1984–1985, he studied at the Petrozavodsk State University. From 1985 to 1987, he served in the Soviet Armed Forces. From 1993, he was engaged in a commercial enterprise in the Republic of Karelia. From 2003 to 2016, he was the deputy of the Legislative Assembly of the Republic of Karelia of the 3rd, 4th, and 5th convocations. On 7 October 2016, he became the Senator from the Legislative Assembly of the Republic of Karelia. In 2021, he was re-appointed.

References

Living people
1966 births
United Russia politicians
21st-century Russian politicians
Members of the Federation Council of Russia (after 2000)
Deputies of the Legislative Assembly of the Republic of Karelia